The German-language surname Löwe, also Lowe or Loewe (German for "lion") may refer to:

 Andreas Loewe (born 1973), a German-born Anglican Priest and Fifteenth Dean of Melbourne
 August Löwe, Russian mathematician
 Carl Loewe (Johann Carl Gottfried Loewe, 1796–1869), a German composer, baritone singer and conductor
 Chris Löwe (born 1989), a German football player
 David Loewe, a cofounder of Loewe AG
 Edward Löwe (1794–1880), an English chess master
 Elisabeth Loewe (1924–1996), German artist
 Erich Löwe (1906–1943), an Oberstleutnant in the Wehrmacht during World War II
 Ferdinand Löwe (1865–1925), an Austrian conductor
 Frederick Loewe (1901–1988), an Austrian-American composer
 Gabriele Löwe (born 1958), a retired East German sprinter
 Joel Löwe (1760–1802), a German-Jewish Biblical commentator
 Johann Jacob Löwe (1628–1703), a German baroque composer and organist
 Ludwig Loewe (1837–1886), a German weapons manufacturer
 Michael Loewe, a British sinologist
 Paul E. Loewe
 Siegmund Loewe, a cofounder of Loewe AG
 Sophie Löwe (1815–1866), a German opera soprano
 Stewart Loewe (born 1968), an Australian rules football player
 Wolfgang Löwe (born 1953), a former German volleyball player
 Wolfram Löwe (born 1945), a former German football player

See also
 Lerner and Loewe, the musical partnership of lyricist Alan Jay Lerner and composer Frederick Loewe
 Loew
 Lowe (surname)

German-language surnames
Surnames from nicknames